Royal Air Maroc (RAM), Morocco's national airline, was founded in  from the merger of Air Maroc and Air Atlas.

, RAM served a network comprising over 90 destinations, of which 56 are international ones. The carrier flies to 17 cities within Morocco and to 11 cities in France; it also serves twelve more countries in the rest of Europe, 24 in Africa, three in the Americas and two in the Middle East, whereas the cargo network comprises another three destinations. International seat capacity to and from Morocco is led by RAM, with 57% of these seats offered to Western Europe traffic; Casablanca–Agadir and –Marrakesh are RAM largest domestic routes.

Following is a list showing the destinations served by the company as part of its scheduled services, . The list includes the country, city and the airport name, with the airline's hubs, cargo, seasonal and focus cities marked. Destinations served by RAM subsidiary Royal Air Maroc Express are also listed.

List

See also

Transport in Morocco

References

External links

Royal Air Maroc
Lists of airline destinations
Oneworld destinations